Hastingsia is a genus of bryozoans belonging to the monotypic family Hastingsiidae.

The species of this genus are found in southernmost South Hemisphere.

Species:

Hastingsia gracilis 
Hastingsia irregularis 
Hastingsia pygmaea 
Hastingsia whitteni

References

Cyclostomatida
Bryozoan genera